Buenos Aires is the capital and most populous city of Argentina.

Buenos Aires may also refer to:

Places

Argentina
 Buenos Aires Central Business District, the central business district of Buenos Aires
 Greater Buenos Aires, the city of Buenos Aires and its surrounding conurbation, with 12 million inhabitants
 Buenos Aires Province, one of Argentina's 23 constituent provinces, which does include most of Greater Buenos Aires but does not include the federal capital
 State of Buenos Aires, a historical period when the province of Buenos Aires acted as a nominally independent state from the Argentine Confederation
 Autódromo Oscar Alfredo Gálvez, a racing circuit near Buenos Aires, commonly known as "Buenos Aires" by motor racing fans
 Lake Buenos Aires

Bolivia 
 Buenos Aires Lake (Bolivia)

Brazil 
 Buenos Aires, Pernambuco, a city

Colombia 
 Buenos Aires, Cauca, a town

Costa Rica 
 Buenos Aires (canton), a canton in the Puntarenas province
 Buenos Aires (Costa Rica), a district in the Puntarenas province
 Buenos Aires District, Palmares, a district in the Alajuela province

Dominican Republic 
 Buenos Aires, Dominican Republic, a sector in the city of Santo Domingo

Mexico 
 Concepción de Buenos Aires, a municipality in the state of Jalisco
 San Nicolás Buenos Aires, a municipality in the state of Puebla

Nicaragua 
 Buenos Aires, Rivas, a municipality

Panama 
 Buenos Aires, Chame, a corregimiento in Panamá Oeste Province
 Buenos Aires, Ñürüm, a corregimiento in Ngäbe-Buglé Comarca

Peru 
 Buenos Aires, Trujillo, a coastal town and resort
 Buenos Aires District, Picota, Peru
 Buenos Aires District, Morropón, Peru

United States 
 Buenos Aires (Santurce), in Santurce, Puerto Rico
 Little Buenos Aires, a neighborhood in Miami Beach, United States
 Buenos Aires National Wildlife Refuge, in the U.S. state of Arizona
 Buenos Aires, Arizona

Ships
 Buenos Aires-class destroyer
 SS Spanish transport Buenos Aires (1887), a Spanish merchant ship

Other uses
 Buenos Aires (song), a song by Iz*One
 "Buenos Aires", a song by Tchami
 "Buenos Aires", a song from Evita
 "Buenos Aires", a song by Nathy Peluso
 Buenos Aires in the Southern Highlands, a social tango event in Australia
 Buenos Aires Convention, a copyright treaty
 Buenos Aires (Madrid Metro), a station on Line 1 of the Madrid Metro

See also 
 Buenos Ayres, a town in Trinidad and Tobago